Edwin Embleton (1907 – 2000) was a commercial and graphic designer who is widely recognised for his work in the Publications Division of the Ministry of Information during the Second World War.

His archive is located at the University of Brighton Design Archives.

Career

Early career 
Born in Hornsey, London, Embleton studied at Hornsey School of Art, finding work at a studio off Grays Inn Road, London. In 1924 he began work at Odhams Press as a layout and lettering artist before becoming Studio Manager.

World War Two 
Embleton was seconded to the General Production Division of the Ministry of Information (MOI) at the outbreak of the Second World War in 1939, where he became Art Director and Studio Manager.

Embleton managed a team of up to seventy staff members including painters, designers, illustrators, layout artists, typographers, calligraphers, cartographers, and cartoonists. Graphic designers Reginald Mount and Eileen Evans reported to Embleton at this time.

In charge of the graphic elements of all propaganda, Embleton commissioned work from whichever artists and designers he chose. They created a vast range of high quality material, which played an important part in Britain's war effort at home and overseas. Subjects included the British forces, the Home Front and the Empire, including leaflets in Afrikaans, Arabic, Hausa, Persian, Swahili and Yoruba.

Post War 
At the end of the war in 1945, Embleton returned to Odhams Press, and was awarded an MBE for his services to the war effort.

External links and further reading 
Imperial War Museum, collections listing - Edwin Embleton
Liddell Hart Centre for Military Archives, King's College London - Edwin J Embleton papers
Lomas, Elizabeth, Guide to the Archive of Art and Design, Victoria & Albert Museum, Routledge, 2001, 
National Archives - INF Records created or inherited by the Central Office of Information
Osley, Anthony, Persuading the People: Government Publicity in the Second World War, Central Office of Information Publishing Services, 1995, 
V&A, Archive of Art and Design - Edwin J Embleton, Ministry of Information collection

References

2000 deaths
1907 births
Propaganda art
English graphic designers